The Ussuri mole or large mole  (Mogera robusta), is a species of mammal in the family Talpidae, formerlly treated as a subspecies of the Japanese mole. It is found in China, North Korea, South Korea, and Russia and lives in a long burrow, seldom emerging on the surface of the ground during the day.

Description 
It is adapted for underground life; the body is cylindrical, the fore-feet are spade-like, the nails are flattened and the eyes are small. The short, dense, dorsal pelage is brownish-grey with a metallic sheen and the underparts are silvery-yellow, with a grey patch on the chest. The bare skin on the muzzle and the feet is yellowish. The short tail is well-covered with hair.

Distribution and habitat 
The Ussuri mole occurs in northeastern China, the Korean peninsula and southeastern Russia. Its typical habitat is montane forest and woodland, pasture and agricultural land but it is seldom found on steep rocky slopes.

Ecology 
This mole is solitary and mainly nocturnal, but is sometimes active on cloudy or rainy days. It feeds mainly on earthworms, insects, spiders, slugs and snails. The breeding chamber contains a globular nest of leaves and grasses. The litter size is from 2 to 6 young with a gestation period of 28 days. Ussuri moles live for up to four years, but sometimes fall prey to owls, snakes and weasels.

Conservation status 
Mogera robusta has a wide range and is said to be abundant in some areas and common in others. Although it used to be hunted for its pelt, this is no longer the case and it now faces no particular threats. The International Union for Conservation of Nature has rated its conservation status as being of "least concern" because, although its population may be in slow decline, this is not at a fast enough rate to warrant listing it in a more threatened category.

References 

Mogera
Mammals of China
Mammals of Korea
Mammals of Russia
Taxa named by Alfred Nehring
Mammals described in 1891
Taxonomy articles created by Polbot